BoBoiBoy Galaxy is an animated series produced by Animonsta Studios. It is the sequel to the original BoBoiBoy. Unlike the original series, BoBoiBoy Galaxy focus more on an adventure based storyline.

BoBoiBoy Galaxy started airing from 25 November 2016 to 11 July 2018 on TV3.

Episode list

External links 

2016 Malaysian television series debuts
Malaysian children's animated science fiction television series